Md. Golam Mustafa is a Jatiya Samajtantrik Dal politician and the former Member of Parliament of Jessore-1.

Career
Mustafa was elected to parliament from Jessore-1 as a Jatiya Samajtantrik Dal candidate in 1979. In 1991, he contested the election from Jhenaidah-1.

References

Jatiya Samajtantrik Dal politicians
Living people
2nd Jatiya Sangsad members
Year of birth missing (living people)